Acacia subtessarogona, commonly known as spreading gidgee, is a tree in the family Fabaceae and the subgenus Juliflorae that is native to a small area in western Australia.

Description
Like most Acacia species, it has phyllodes rather than true leaves.

Distribution
Endemic to Western Australia, it occurs only in a small area of the Gascoyne River catchment near Carnarvon with outlying population near Wiluna. It is often found situated in low-lying area, along creeklines or on rocky ground growing in red loamy soils and is commonly associated with Acacia sclerosperma and Acacia tetragonophylla and sometimes with Acacia ancistrocarpa.

See also
List of Acacia species

References

 

Acacias of Western Australia
subtessarogona
Plants described in 1976
Taxa named by Mary Tindale
Taxa named by Bruce Maslin